Pantaleón Enrique Joaquín Granados Campiña (27 July 1867 – 24 March 1916), commonly known as Enrique Granados in Spanish or Enric Granados in Catalan, was a Spanish composer of classical music, and concert pianist from Catalonia, Spain.

Life 

Pantaleón Enrique Joaquín Granados Campiña was born in Lleida, Spain, the son of Calixto José de la Trinidad Granados y Armenteros, a Spanish army captain who was born in Havana, Cuba, and Enriqueta Elvira Campiña de Herrera, from Santander, Spain. As a young man he studied piano in Barcelona, where his teachers included Francisco Jurnet and Joan Baptista Pujol. In 1887 he went to Paris to study. He was unable to become a student at the Paris Conservatoire, but he was able to take private lessons with a conservatoire professor, Charles-Wilfrid de Bériot, whose mother, the soprano Maria Malibran, was of Spanish ancestry. Bériot insisted on extreme refinement in tone production, which strongly influenced Granados's teaching of pedal technique. He also fostered Granados's abilities in improvisation. Just as important were his studies with Felip Pedrell. He returned to Barcelona in 1889. His first successes were at the end of the 1890s, with the opera María del Carmen, which attracted the attention of King Alfonso XIII.

In 1903, Granados participated in a competition organized by Tomás Bretón of the Madrid Royal Conservatory, which awarded a considerable sum of 500 pesetas for the best "concert allegro" for solo piano. Granados submitted his Allegro de concierto, Op. 46, for which the jury declared him the winner with an almost unanimous vote. The win brought Granados to national attention.

In 1911 Granados premiered his suite for piano Goyescas, which became his most famous work. It is a set of six pieces based on paintings of Francisco Goya. Such was the success of this work that he was encouraged to expand it. He wrote an opera based on the subject in 1914, but the outbreak of World War I forced the European premiere to be canceled. It was performed for the first time in New York City on 28 January 1916 and was very well received. Shortly afterwards, he was invited to perform a piano recital for President Woodrow Wilson. Before leaving New York, Granados also made live-recorded player piano music rolls for the New-York-based Aeolian Company's "Duo-Art" system, all of which survive today and can be heard – his last recordings.

Death
A delay in New York, incurred by accepting a recital invitation, caused him to miss his boat back to Spain. Instead, he took a ship to England, where he boarded the passenger ferry SS Sussex for Dieppe, France. On the way across the English Channel, the Sussex was torpedoed by a German U-boat, as part of the German World War I policy of unrestricted submarine warfare. According to witness Daniel Sargent, Granados's wife, Amparo, was too heavy to get into a lifeboat. Granados refused to leave her and positioned her on a small life raft on which she knelt and he clung. Both then drowned within sight of other passengers. However, according to a different account from another survivor, ""A survivor of the 1916 torpedo attack on a Cross channel ferry, Sussex, recognised Spanish composer Granados in a lifeboat, his wife in the water. Granados dived in to save her and perished." The ship broke in two parts, and only one sank (along with 80 passengers). Ironically, the part of the vessel that contained his cabin did not sink and was towed to port, with most of the passengers, except for Granados and his wife, who were on the other side of the boat when it was hit. Granados and his wife left six children: Eduard (a musician), Solita, Enrique (a swimming champion), Víctor, Natalia, and Francisco.

The personal papers of Enrique Granados are preserved in, among other institutions, the National Library of Catalonia.

Music and influence 
Granados wrote piano music, chamber music (a piano quintet, a piano trio, music for violin and piano), songs, zarzuelas, and an orchestral tone poem based on Dante's Divine Comedy. Many of his piano compositions have been transcribed for the classical guitar; examples include Dedicatoria, Danza No. 5, and Goyescas.

His music can be divided into three styles or periods:
A romantic style including such pieces as Escenas Románticas and Escenas Poeticas.
A more typically nationalist, Spanish style including such pieces as Danzas Españolas (Spanish Dances), 6 Piezas sobre cantos populares españoles (Six Pieces based on popular Spanish songs).
The Goya (Goyesca) period, which includes the piano suite Goyescas, the opera Goyescas, various Tonadillas for voice and piano, and other works.

Granados was a significant influence on at least two other famous Spanish composers and musicians, Manuel de Falla and Pablo Casals. He was also the teacher of composer Rosa García Ascot.

Some important works 

12 danzas españolas (1890) for piano; Op. 37, H. 142, DLR 1:2. The contents of the four volumes are: Vol. 1: Galante (or Minueto), Oriental, Fandango (or Zarabanda); Vol. 2: Villanesca; Andaluza (or Playera); Rondalla aragonesa (or Jota); Vol. 3: Valenciana; Sardana (or Asturiana); Romántica (or Mazurca); Vol. 4: Melancólica (or Danza Triste); Zambra; Arabesca.
María del Carmen (1898), opera
Allegro de concierto (1904)
Escenas románticas (1903) for piano. The individual "scenes" are: Mazurca; Berceuse; Allegretto; Mazurka; Allegro appassionato; Epílogo
Dante (1908), symphonic poem
Titles of individual songs in the collection are: "Amor y odio"; "Callejeo"; "El majo discreto"; "El majo olvidado"; "El majo tímido"; "El mirar de la maja"; "El tra-la-la y el punteado"; "La maja de Goya"; "La maja dolorosa I (Oh muerte cruel!), II (Ay majo de mi vida!), and III (De aquel majo amante)"; "La currutacas modestas" (duet).
Canciones españolas for voice and piano. Titles of individual songs in the collection are: "Yo no tengo quien me llore"; "Cantar I"; "Por una mirada, un mundo"; "Si al retiro me llevas..."; "Canción"; "Serenata"; "Canto gitano".
Cançons catalanas for voice and piano. Titles of individual songs in the collection are: "L'ocell profeta"; "Elegía eterna"; "Cançó de Gener"; "Cançó d'amor"; "Cançoneta"; "La boira".
Goyescas (1911), suite for piano, subtitled "Los majos enamorados". It consists of six pieces in two books. Movements are: Book 1: "Los requiebros"; "Coloquio en la reja"; "El fandango de candil"; "Quejas o La maja y el ruiseñor"; Book 2: "El amor y la muerte"; "Epílogo (Serenata del espectro)". "El pelele", although not published as part of the Goyescas, is usually appended to it. In performance it is played as the seventh and last piece. It is based on the music of the opening scene of Granados's opera Goyescas, in which a "pelele" is being tossed in the air by the "majas".
Bocetos (1912) which contains: "Despertar del cazador"; "El hada y el niño"; "Vals muy lento"; "La campana de la tarde".
Colección de canciones amatorias (1915) for voice and piano. Titles of individual songs in the collection are:  "Descúbrase el pensamiento de mi secreto cuidado"; "Mañanica era"; "Llorad, corazón, que tenéis razón 'Lloraba la niña'"; "Mira que soy niña"; "No lloréis, ojuelos"; "Iban al pinar 'Serranas de Cuenca'"; "Gracia mía".
Goyescas, opera, 1916
6 Estudios expresivos
6 Piezas sobre cantos populares españoles, which include: "Añoranza"; "Ecos de la parranda"; "Vascongada"; "Marcha oriental"; "Zambra"; "Zapateado"
Madrigal, for cello and piano
8 Valses Poéticos, for piano, including No 6 "Vals Poético"
Trío, for piano, violin, and cello
"Military March", for piano, Op.38

Media

References

Notes

Sources and further reading 
 
 
 
 
 San-Juan, Pablo Vila: Papeles íntimos de Enrique Granados. Amigos de Granados, 1966. 
 Perandones, Miriam: "El compositor catalán Enrique Granados Análisis de tres canciones de concierto: La boyra (1900), Cansó d’amor (1902) y Elegia eterna (1912)". Recerca musicològica, nos. 20–21, 2013–2014, pp. 277–304 
 Perandones, Miriam: "La canción de Enrique Granados: un microcosmos estilístico", Cuadernos de música iberoamericana, Vol. 22, 2011, pp. 151–186 
 Perandones, Miriam: "Enrique Granados en París: la construcción de un icono español en el ámbito musical internacional", Revista de Musicología, Vol. 34, Nº 1, 2011, págs. 203–232. 
 Perandones, Miriam: "Estancia y recepción de Enrique Granados en Nueva York (1915–1916) desde la perspectiva de su epistolario inédito", Revista de Musicología, Vol. 32, Nº 1, 2009, pp. 281–295. 
 Comentaris a la gravació de la suite "Goyescas" per a piano. Joaquín Achúcarro, RCA Records, Madrid, 1980. D.L. M 8232-80 
 Historia de la Música Española. Siglo XIX. Carlos Gómez Amat, Alianza Música, 1984.  
 Enrique Granados (su obra para piano). 2 vols. Antonio Iglesias, Editorial Alpuerto, 1985–1986.  i 84-3810101-1 
 Granados. Antoni Carreras i Granados, Nou Art Thor, 1988. .

Recordings 
Goyescas, Part 1, Los Requiebros as recorded by Granados on piano roll, c. 1913, Paris (Info)
L'escola pianística catalana (Enregistraments històrics) (la mà de guido, LMG3060)
Enrique Granados today playing his 1913 interpretations (The Welte Mignon Mystery Vol. I)
Enrique Granados: Composer as Pianist (Pierian Recording Society, PIR0002) 
Masters of the Piano Roll: Granados Plays Granados (Dal Segno Records, DSPRCD008)
The Catalan Piano Tradition (VAI Audio, 1001) 
Rollos de Pianola (Obras de Albéniz, Granados, Turina, Ocón, Chapí, Alonso y Otros) (Almaviva, DS – 0141) 
Piano Rolls (The Reproducing Piano Roll Foundation)

External links 

 Biography and images
 www.kreusch-sheet-music.net – Free Scores by Granados
Personal papers of Enric Granados in the Biblioteca de Catalunya
 

1867 births
1916 deaths
19th-century classical composers
19th-century classical pianists
19th-century Spanish composers
19th-century Spanish male musicians
20th-century classical composers
20th-century classical pianists
20th-century Spanish composers
20th-century Spanish male musicians
Civilians killed in World War I
Deaths by drowning
Classical composers from Catalonia
Composers for piano
Male classical pianists
People from Lleida
People who died at sea
Spanish classical composers
Spanish classical pianists
Spanish male classical composers
Spanish people of World War I
Spanish Romantic composers